Slobodan Vuksanović (born in 1965 in Belgrade) is a poet, essayist, translator and former Serbian politician, who served as Minister of Education and Sport in the Government of Serbia from 2004 to 2007.

Biography
He was appointed as a minister on October 19, 2004, after an unsuccessful attempt to become mayor of Belgrade. He replaced Ljiljana Čolić, who was forced to leave after she made several controversial decisions.

He graduated with a bachelor's degree in literature from the University of Belgrade, and obtained his PhD at the University of Novi Sad. He has been the editor of several magazines, a teacher in a secondary school, and has written 12 books. He was the president of the People's Democratic Party, which integrated into the Democratic Party of Serbia in 2004. Vuksanović decided to leave DSS in April 2013 stating that his membership became pointless, as he had no party assignment being a passive member for five years.

He received his Ph.D. at the European University in Belgrade in the field of International relations, in 2009. Professor of Methodology of literature and Literature for children at the State University of Novi Pazar from 2009 to 2014. He has published 25 books - essays, manuals, textbooks, monodramas, novels and poems.
Vuksanovic quit his job at the State University of Novi Pazar in December 2013 and moved to private school in Belgrade - MEF - ( management, economics, finance, mathematics, computer science, communication studies, sociology), where is the head of the Department of Social Sciences and teaches Sociology and Communication.
Amended to the book Outstanding intellectuals 2010 Biographical Institute, University of Cambridge.

Vuksanović speaks English.

Selected bibliography
With a translator Irena Kostic, translated S - John Updike (1989) and Eternal grief - and Book about gods and angels, Charles Simic (1989).

Halley's comet over Kosovo (1990), Poems, Hypnos, Belgrade
Essay about angels (1992), Poems, Rad Belgrade
Journey Helen Erdeljan (1993), Poems, Student Cultural Center, Belgrade
Hand made by fire (1994), Poems, work, Belgrade
Now think of the head (1995), second edition (1997) and third (2000), this monodrama premiered on October 3, 1996. In the theater Radovic, BIGZ, Belgrade
Unspoken poems (1993), Essays, Kids newspapers, Gornji Milanovac
Bicycle writings of (1993), Essays, Cultural Center, S. Palanka
Songs from the border (1995), Essays, Prosveta, Belgrade
Poetics homeland (1998), Essays, Culture, Cacak
Far from the sensational (2000), Essays, Blic, Belgrade
Fox on the asphalt (2000), Novel, Euro, Belgrade
Suppressed Literature (2003), Essays, The Association of Writers of Serbia
Poem of Kosovo (1991), bilingual anthology of poetry
Political Communication (2009), Essays, Prosveta, Belgrade
God forbid, God forbid (2009), Monodrama-monodramas, bilingual, Serbian-English edition, Prosveta, Belgrade
Notes on Reading Materials I (2009), Essays The Book of Commerce, Belgrade
Notes on Reading Materials II (2009), Essays  The Book of Commerce, Belgrade
Little People (review of literature for children) (2010), Essays, Book Commerce, Belgrade
56 examples, manual processing and methodological lessons, Essays (2011), The Book of Commerce, Belgrade
Methodical reminder - Manual for students and teachers (2012), The Book of Commerce, Belgrade
Small letters large Anji (2012), Laguna, Beograd
General characteristics of children's literature (2012), a manual for students and teachers, Sprint, Belgrade
Methodical practice (2012), a manual for students and teachers, Sprint, Belgrade
Small letters to my daughter Anya (2013), second edition, Laguna, Beograd
Letters to my daughter Anya (2013), published in English, Laguna, Beograd
The secret of a courtyard (2014) Poems for teenagers, Čigoja, Belgrade
Pavlovic shop (2015) Stories, Čigoja, Belgrade

References

1965 births
Living people
Writers from Belgrade
Serbian novelists
University of Novi Sad alumni
University of Belgrade Faculty of Philology alumni
People's Democratic Party (Serbia) politicians
Democratic Party of Serbia politicians
Government ministers of Serbia
Politicians from Belgrade
Education ministers of Serbia